Small plaque parapsoriasis  characteristically occurs with skin lesions that are round, oval, discrete patches or thin plaques, mainly on the trunk.

Subtypes:
 Xanthoerythrodermia perstans is a distinct variant with lesions that are yellow in color.
 Digitate dermatosis is a distinct variant with lesions in the shape of a finger and distributed symmetrically on the flanks.

See also
 Parapsoriasis
 List of cutaneous conditions

References

External links 

Papulosquamous hyperkeratotic cutaneous conditions